François Octave Dugas,  (April 12, 1852 – June 22, 1918) was a Canadian politician.

Born in St-Jacques de l'Achigan, Montcalm County, Canada East, the son of Aimé Dugas and Sophie Poirier, Dugas was educated at St. Mary's College in Montreal and McGill University. He was admitted to the Quebec bar in 1880 and set up practice as a lawyer in Joliette. Dugas was Crown Prosecutor for the District of Joliette from 1887 to 1892 and again from 1897 to 1909. He also served as solicitor for the town of Joliette from 1890 to 1900. Dugas was created a King's Counsel in 1899. He was first elected to the House of Commons of Canada for the electoral district of Montcalm in the general elections of 1900. A Liberal, He was re-elected in 1904 and 1908.

In 1909, he was named judge in the Quebec Superior Court for Joliette district. He died at Joliette at the age of 66.

His son Lucien served as a member of the Quebec assembly.

Electoral record

References
 
 The Canadian Parliament; biographical sketches and photo-engravures of the senators and members of the House of Commons of Canada. Being the tenth Parliament, elected November 3, 1904

1852 births
1918 deaths
Liberal Party of Canada MPs
Members of the House of Commons of Canada from Quebec
Judges in Quebec
People from Lanaudière
Canadian King's Counsel
McGill University alumni